Nantmor is a hamlet which lies about 1½ miles to the south of the village of Beddgelert in Gwynedd, Wales.

The current spelling of the name Nantmor is more modernmost old documents  from the 16th to the 18th century record the name as Nanmor.

It lies close to the scenic Aberglaslyn Pass and the Welsh Highland Railway. Nantmor station has re-opened, following a 2007 vote in its favour by local residents.

A car park run by the National Trust is a popular starting point for walks up Cwm Bychan or along the Aberglaslyn.

The village is perhaps most famous for being the home of Dafydd Nanmor, a renowned 15th century bard (died c. 1490), who took his name from the hamlet, as did Rhys Nanmor after him. Dafydd Nanmor himself was possibly a bardic student of Rhys Goch, who lived at neighbouring Hafod Garegog.

Filmed in Nantmor in 1957 the Inn of the Sixth Happiness is a 1958 British 20th Century Fox film based on the true story of Gladys Aylward, a tenacious British maid, who became a missionary in China during the tumultuous years leading up to the Second World War.

Carneddi, a nearby hill farm, was the home of Ruth Janette Ruck, who published a trilogy of books about her experiences in the 1950s, 1960s and 1970s, namely Place of Stones, Hill Farm Story and Along Came a Llama. In 1980 she featured in the HTV About Britain series in an episode called "The Lady and the Llama", which featured a year on the farm. 

Notable people include Joe Faithfull.

External links

 Biography of Dafydd Nanmor
  Capel Peniel Nantmor
 www.geograph.co.uk : photos of Nantmor and surrounding area

Villages in Gwynedd
Villages in Snowdonia
Beddgelert